Lock and Dam No. 9 is a lock and dam located near Lynxville, Wisconsin and Harpers Ferry, Iowa on the Upper Mississippi River around river mile 647.9. The lower portion of Pool 9 was formally named Lake Winneshiek. It was constructed and placed in operation in July 1937. The site underwent a major rehabilitation from 1989 and 2006. Lock and Dam No. 9 is located 12 miles upstream from Prairie du Chien, Wisconsin. The lock and dam are owned and operated by the St. Paul District of the United States Army Corps of Engineers-Mississippi Valley Division.

Images

See also
 Blackhawk Park
 Public Works Administration dams list
 Upper Mississippi River National Wildlife and Fish Refuge

References

External links

U.S. Army Corps of Engineers, St. Paul District: Lock and Dam 9
U.S. Army Corps of Engineers, St. Paul District: Lock and Dam 9 brochure
Blackhawk Park - U.S. Army Corps of Engineers Park
Lock and Dam No. 9 Fishing Forum
USGS Reach 1, Pool 9

Friends of Pool 9 - Nonprofit organization dedicated to keeping the pool clean, managing annual volunteer cleanups, particularly of backwaters

Mississippi River locks
Buildings and structures in Allamakee County, Iowa
Buildings and structures in Crawford County, Wisconsin
Driftless Area
Transportation buildings and structures in Allamakee County, Iowa
Dams in Iowa
Dams in Wisconsin
United States Army Corps of Engineers dams
Transport infrastructure completed in 1937
Roller dams
Gravity dams
Dams on the Mississippi River
Mississippi Valley Division
Historic American Engineering Record in Iowa
Historic American Engineering Record in Wisconsin
Locks of Iowa
Locks of Wisconsin
1937 establishments in Iowa
1937 establishments in Wisconsin